The 2005 Cheltenham Gold Cup was a horse race which took place at Cheltenham on Friday 18 March 2005. It was the 77th running of the Cheltenham Gold Cup, and it was won by the pre-race favourite Kicking King. The winner was ridden by Barry Geraghty and trained by Tom Taaffe.

Kicking King was the first winner of the Gold Cup to be trained in Ireland since Imperial Call in 1996. The three-time winner Best Mate was withdrawn from the race a week earlier after bursting a blood vessel. A fourth day was added to the Cheltenham Festival this year, and the Gold Cup was switched to a new day, Friday.

Race details
 Sponsor: Totesport
 Winner's prize money: £212,268.40
 Going: Good
 Number of runners: 15
 Winner's time: 6m 42.9s

Full result

* The distances between the horses are shown in lengths or shorter. nk = neck; PU = pulled-up.† Trainers are based in Great Britain unless indicated.

Winner's details
Further details of the winner, Kicking King:

 Foaled: 10 April 1998, in Ireland
 Sire: Old Vic; Dam: Fairy Blaze (Good Thyne)
 Owner: Conor Clarkson
 Breeder: Sunnyhill Stud

References
 
 sportinglife.com
 bbc.co.uk – "Kicking King triumphs in Gold Cup" – March 18, 2005.

Cheltenham Gold Cup
 2005
Cheltenham Gold Cup
Cheltenham Gold Cup
2000s in Gloucestershire